Beth Goetz (born July 30, 1974) is an American college athletics administrator, currently serving as the deputy athletic director and chief operating officer at the University of Iowa. She previously served as director of athletics at Ball State University from 2018 to 2022, as chief operating officer at the University of Connecticut from 2016 to 2018, as interim athletic director at the University of Minnesota from 2015 to 2016, as a deputy athletic director at the University of Minnesota from 2013 to 2015, as an associate athletic director at Butler University from 2008 to 2013, and as an assistant athletic director at the University of Missouri–St. Louis from 2000 to 2008. Goetz served as head women's soccer coach at the University of Missouri–St. Louis from 1997 to 2007, compiling a record of 120–90–9. Goetz attended college at Brevard College and Clemson University, playing on the school women's soccer team at both schools as a defender or midfielder. Goetz was named athletic director at Ball State University on May 21, 2018. On September 7, 2022, Goetz was named deputy athletic director and chief operating officer at the University of Iowa.

Head coaching record

References

External links
 
 Connecticut profile

1974 births
Living people
American women's soccer players
Women's association football defenders
Women's association football midfielders
Brevard Tornados women's soccer players
Clemson Tigers women's soccer players
American women's soccer coaches
Female association football managers
UMSL Tritons women's soccer coaches
Women college athletic directors in the United States
Minnesota Golden Gophers athletic directors
Ball State Cardinals athletic directors
University of Missouri–St. Louis alumni